The Leica M Monochrom is a full-frame digital rangefinder camera of Leica Camera AG, and features a
monochrome sensor. The camera was announced on May 10, 2012. Delivery started September 2012 in black finish only. A Leica M Monochrom in Silver was announced May 22, 2014.

The camera was succeeded by the Leica M Monochrom (Typ 246) in 2015.

Details
The nickname for the camera through design and development at Leica Camera AG was "Henri" as a tribute to Henri Cartier-Bresson but at introduction, Leica Camera AG decided on the name Leica M Monochrom.

The camera is based on the same Kodak CCD sensor as the Leica M9 but without the color filter array. This makes the sensor one stop faster and the base ISO of the sensor is 320 ISO instead of the 160 ISO of the Leica M9. The body of the Leica M Monochrom is likewise based on the Leica M9 with few changes of the metals, leather and paint used.

Leica claim that the camera delivers 100% sharper images than monochrome images derived from a camera with a color sensor (of comparable megapixels). The camera is able to alter the captured image to apply three toning effects (called sepia, cold, and selenium).

The achieved sharpness is due to the lack of a color filter array, thus avoiding the process of demosaicing by capturing the true luminance
value of each photosensor. 
The removal of the color filter array also means that no incoming light is filtered, making the sensor more light sensitive, which explains the high native ISO of 320.

References

External links 

 Thorsten Overgaard review, user report, interviews, sample photos and manual: 

 

M Monochrom
Digital rangefinder cameras
Cameras introduced in 2012